Alypiodes geronimo is a moth in the family Noctuidae (the owlet moths). first described by William Barnes in 1900. It is found in North America and parts of Mexico. 

The MONA or Hodges number for Alypiodes geronimo is 9313.

Description 
The species is sexually dimorphic, unlike Alypiodes bimaculata, females have two spots on their forewing, while males have a third extra spot on theirs.

References

Further reading

 
 
 

Agaristinae
Articles created by Qbugbot
Moths described in 1900